The Japanese University Network in the Bay Area (JUNBA) is a network among Japanese university offices in the Bay Area. The mission of JUNBA is to assist the enhancement of education and research activities and the creation of new businesses for Japanese universities.

The current core members include the following.
Fukuoka Institute of Technology
Japan Society for the Promotion of Science 
J. F. Oberlin University
Kagoshima University
Kyushu University
Osaka University
Tohoku University
Tokyo Institute of Technology
Tokyo University of Science
Yokohama City University
Waseda University

References

External links 

International college and university associations and consortia